The 1919 Tiong Hoa Championship season (known as the C.K.T.H Championship for organisation reasons) was the third season of the Dutch East Indies Tiong Hoa Championship football competition since its establishment in 1917. Union Semarang are the defending champions, having won their first league title.

It was contested by 3 teams, and U.M.S. Batavia won the championship.

All matches play in Batavia.

Semi-finals
Tiong Hoa Soerabaja get a bye from the semifinals.

Final

References

External links
C.K.T.H./H.N.V.B. (chineesche) Stedenwedstrĳden

1919 in the Dutch East Indies
Seasons in Indonesian football competitions
1919 in Asian football
Sport in the Dutch East Indies